USS Peter C. Struven (SP-332) was a  patrol boat in the United States Navy, placed in service 9 August 1917. She was a steel-hulled steamboat and had been originally used as a fishing boat.

The Peter C. Struven was assigned to the 5th Naval District and patrolled the area of Hampton Roads and Elizabeth River during World War I. She was sold to Lewes Oil and Chemical on 1 July 1919.

See also 
 USS Joseph F. Bellows (SP-323)

References 

Ships built in Pocomoke City, Maryland
1907 ships
Patrol vessels of the United States Navy
World War I patrol vessels of the United States